Arkadi Duchin (born 1 June 1963) is an Israeli singer-songwriter and musical producer.

Biography
Arkadi Duchin was born in Babruysk, Belarus. He immigrated to Israel at the age of 15. He is married to Sima, with whom he has a daughter. He lives in Givatayim.

Music career
Duchin sang in the rock band HaChaverim Shel Natasha (The Friends of Natasha). The band, which he formed in 1986 with Micha Shitrit, made five albums, including the 1994 album Radio Blah Blah, before its breakup in 1996. Dudu Fisher, David D'Or, Eran Zur, and Meir Banai joined in the song "Lisa" on "Radio Blah-Blah".

After 9/11, Duchin and Etti Ankri, Zehava Ben, David D'Or, and other Israeli singers recorded the title song "Yesh Od Tikvah" ("Our Hope Endures"), for which D'Or wrote the music and lyrics, on the CD Yesh Od Tikvah/You've Got a Friend.  

The CD, released by Hed Arzi in 2002, benefitted Israeli terror victims, with all proceeds going to "NATAL": the "Israel Trauma center for Victims of Terror and War".

In 2002, he was nominated for the Tamuz Award of Israel's Best Male Artist, along with David D'or, Shlomi Shabat, Yuval Gabay, and Yehuda Poliker, but lost out to D'Or.
 
Duchin sang a duet with David D'Or on D'Or's CD, Kmo HaRuach ("Like the Wind"), which was released on 27 March 2006.

In 2009, Duchin released a children's album, Friends of Arkasha.

Culinary and media career
In 2004, Duchin opened a restaurant on Frishman Street in Tel Aviv, which closed a year later. He hosted a cooking show on Israel's Russian language television channel in which Israeli singers were invited to cook a meal.

See also
Music of Israel

References

External links 

1963 births
Living people
Israeli male songwriters
21st-century Israeli male singers
Soviet emigrants to Israel
20th-century Israeli male singers
Israeli rock singers
Jewish Israeli musicians
Israeli people of Belarusian-Jewish descent
Israeli record producers
Israeli pop singers
Israeli Ashkenazi Jews